The Transit Planning Board was a joint commission of the Atlanta Regional Commission (ARC), Georgia Regional Transportation Authority (GRTA), and Metropolitan Atlanta Rapid Transit Authority (MARTA).

The TPB partnership was founded in 2006, holding its first meeting on February 16, adopting bylaws on April 20, and adopting a work plan on August 17.  It states that it "is a partnership leading the establishment and maintenance of a seamless, integrated transit network for the Atlanta region. 

Specifically, TPB will:
 Develop a regional transit plan including a comprehensive financial plan;
 Work to improve regional service coordination, including integrating fares, marketing and customer information;
 Measure system performance; and,
 Advocate for increased federal funding for regional transit."

Members
Some of the following may have changed since 2007.

Agency representatives
 GDOT Chair, Gena Abraham
 GRTA Chair, Walter Deriso
 MARTA Acting Chair, Michael Walls
 MARTA General Manager, Beverly Scott

Local elected officials
 Atlanta Mayor, Shirley Franklin
 Cherokee County Chair, Buzz Ahrens
 Clayton County Chair, Eldrin Bell, TPB vice-chairman
 Cobb County Chair, Sam Olens
 DeKalb County CEO, Vernon Jones
 Douglas County Chair, Tom Worthan
 Fayette County Chair, Jack Smith
 Fulton County Chair, John Eaves
 Gwinnett County Chair, Charles Bannister
 Henry County Chair, Jason Harper
 Rockdale County Chair, Roy Middlebrooks
 Spalding County Chair, Eddie Freeman

Appointees of the governor of Georgia
 Douglas Tollett
 Lara O’Connor Hodgson
 Pam Sessions

It does not have any representatives from Cobb Community Transit (CCT), Gwinnett County Transit (GCT), or C-TRAN, the local suburban bus systems.

Concept 3
Concept 3 is the third and final draft of a plan to build an extensive network of commuter rail, light rail, and bus rapid transit by 2030, totaling about 500 miles or 800 kilometers.  It was finalized in July 2008 and adopted in August 2008.

External links
TPB official website

2006 establishments in Georgia (U.S. state)
Atlanta metropolitan area